Grandma Tree is a record setting Douglas fir in Oregon. The tree sits near North Fork Coquille River in Coos County.

References

 

Individual trees in Oregon
Individual Douglas firs